Thomas James Prest (born 24 March 2003) is an English cricketer. He made his Twenty20 debut on 25 June 2021, for Hampshire in the 2021 T20 Blast. Prior to his Twenty20 debut, Prest scored a triple century for the Second XI team in May 2021. On 6 July 2021, he made his first-class debut, for Hampshire in the 2021 County Championship, as a replacement player for James Vince. He made his List A debut on 22 July 2021, for Hampshire in the 2021 Royal London One-Day Cup.

In December 2021, he was named as the captain of England's team for the 2022 ICC Under-19 Cricket World Cup in the West Indies.

In August 2022, he scored 181 from 138 balls against Kent in the 2022 Royal London One-Day Cup.

References

External links
 

2003 births
Living people
English cricketers
Hampshire cricketers
People from Wimborne Minster
Cricketers from Dorset
Dorset cricketers